Serge de Poligny (1903–1983) was a French screenwriter and film director.

Career
Serge de Poligny was born in Paris in 1903.  He studied art at the École des Beaux-Arts in the class of the painter Maurice Denis. In 1925 he joined the French subsidiary of the Paramount film company as a set-designer and painter, and soon took on the role of an assistant director. With the arrival of sound films, he took a job with UFA studios in Germany, supervising the French-language versions of films which were made in parallel with their German originals.

Serge de Poligny's first significant film as a director in France was an adaptation of Colette's novel Claudine à l'école in 1937. During the German Occupation in the 1940s, he made two films which have been seen as significant contributions to the genre of fantastique in the cinema. For Le Baron fantôme (1943) he worked with Jean Cocteau on the film's dialogue (Cocteau also acted in the title role), and Christian Dior designed the costumes. De Poligny said that he got the idea for it in an old magic book. His next film, La Fiancée des ténèbres (1945), was based on an old Cathar legend.
His film career concluded in the mid-1950s, and he then devoted himself to the production of large-scale live shows, such as the commemorations of the Liberation of Paris (1964 & 1965); the Nuits de l'armée, and horse-riding shows like the Fêtes mondiales du cheval.

Personal life
In 1932 de Poligny married Irène Sachse and they were divorced in 1946. In 1949 he married Yolande Mazuc. Serge de Poligny died at Saint-Cloud on 23 March 1983.

Selected filmography
Director

References

Bibliography
 Crisp, C.G. The classic French cinema, 1930-1960. Indiana University Press, 1993
 Oscherwitz, Dayna & Higgins, MaryEllen. The A to Z of French Cinema. Scarecrow Press, 2009.

External links

1903 births
1983 deaths
Film directors from Paris